Lorenzo Ebecilio (born 24 September 1991) is a Dutch professional footballer who plays as a midfielder for Vierde Divisie club DHSC.

An Ajax academy product, he debuted for Ajax in the 2010–11 Eredivisie. During the first two seasons, despite his young age, he established himself as a regular starter and contributed significantly for two championships. However, his playing time dropped significantly in his third season, so in January 2013 Ebecilio leaves Ajax. He starts his journey abroad in Eastern Europe, first in Ukraine with Metalurh Donetsk, next with Azerbeijani club Gabala, before establishing himself in Russia where he spent almost three years playing with Mordovia Saransk and Anzhi Makhachkala. During the winter-break of the 2016–17 season Ebecilio left Russia and joined Cypriot side APOEL. Ebecilio spent two seasons with the Cypriot side,  where he was a key player, scoring 11 times in 58 appearances.

In June 2018, Ebecilio signed a two-year contract with Serbian club Red Star Belgrade. From July 2019 until February 2020, he played for J1 League club Jubilo Iwata.

Internationally, Ebecilio represented the Netherlands at U17, U19 and U21 levels.

Club career

Early years
Ebecilio started his career with VV de Blokkers, an amateur club from Hoorn. He would later play in the youth teams of HVV Hollandia and AZ.

On 27 October 2005, several months following the death of his father, the fourteen-year-old Ebecilio had a heart attack and had to have a defibrillator surgically implanted. He was forced to leave AZ due to these health concerns, and the player returned to HVV Hollandia. He no longer has any problems related to his heart following the surgery. Ajax subsequently offered him a place in their youth academy.

Ajax
At Ajax, Ebecilio played for Jong Ajax under manager Frank de Boer. On 12 December 2010, six days after the departure of Martin Jol and the installation of De Boer as caretaker manager, Ebecilio made his debut in the first team of Ajax, being in the starting line-up in an away victory over Vitesse Arnhem. The player also appeared in the starting line-up in the last game of 2010, in a 1–0 victory over former club AZ, playing the full 90 minutes. He was named man-of-the-match in the game against his former club.

2011 began much like 2010 had ended, with the player being in the starting line-up for the league matches against Feyenoord, FC Utrecht, NAC Breda, and De Graafschap. On 17 February 2011, Ebecilio made his European debut in the 3–0 Europa League away victory over Anderlecht. Ebecilio participated in most of Ajax matches during the second half of the season, ultimately leading to the Dutch league championship. Ebecilio also appeared in the KNVB Cup final against FC Twente. Ajax lost the final with 3–2, despite one goal of Ebecilio. On 4 March 2012, Ebecilio scored his first hat-trick for Ajax in a 4–1 win over Roda JC.

Metalurh Donetsk
The 2012–13 season saw Ebecilio receiving much less playing time. On 2 January 2013, Marc Overmars announced the transfer of Ebecilio to Ukrainian club Metalurh Donetsk on a three-year contract, for a sum of €500,000.

Loan to Gabala
On 5 June 2013, it was announced that Ebecilio had signed a one-year loan deal with Azerbaijan Premier League team Gabala. Ebecilio made his debut for Gabala on 2 August 2013, Gabala's first games of the 2013–14 season against Baku.
His first goal for Gabala came in his fifth game, a 3–2 home victory over Inter Baku on 31 August 2013.

Loan to Mordovia Saransk
Following the end of his Gabala contract, Ebecilio followed Ibrahima Niasse and Yuri Semin to Mordovia Saransk, by joining the club on trial. On 24 July 2014, Ebecilio joined Mordovia Saransk on a season-long loan deal. During his league debut for Mordovia, on 2 August, Ebecilio fractured his tibia in a challenge with Chisamba Lungu, and was ruled out for around six months.

Anzhi Makhachkala
On 7 July 2015, Ebecilio signed for Anzhi Makhachkala on a three-year contract, linking up with Yuri Semin for a third season.

APOEL
On 26 January 2017, Ebecilio signed a two-and-a-half-year contract with Cypriot First Division champions APOEL FC. He made his official debut on 20 February 2017, coming on as an 85th-minute substitute in APOEL's 3–0 home victory against AEL Limassol in the 2016–17 Cypriot First Division. He scored his first competitive goal for APOEL on 9 April 2017 in his team's 1–0 league win against arch rivals Omonia.

Red Star Belgrade
On 29 June 2018, Ebecilio signed a two-year deal with Red Star Belgrade with an option for a one-year extension. One of the main reasons the club signed him was because a replacement was needed for Guélor Kanga, who had left the club six-months ago. Ebecilio made his debut in the first leg match of the UEFA Champions League First qualifying round  against Spartaks Jūrmala, replacing Nemanja Milić at the half-time. Ebecilio made his Serbian SuperLiga debut in 3–0 victory over Dinamo Vranje on 20 July 2018, when he also assisted Dejan Joveljić for his  second goal of the match. Ebecilio scored his first goal for Red Star against Lithuanian club Sūduva on 24 July 2018, in the first leg match of the Champions League second qualifying round.

Júbilo Iwata
On 27 July 2019, Ebecilio signed for J1 League club Júbilo Iwata. In February 2020, he terminated his contract with Júbilo Iwata.

Achyronas Liopetriou 
After being without a club for nearly two years, in July 2022 Ebecilio signed for Achyronas Liopetriou in the Cypriot Second Division. He left the club in October 2022.

Makedonikos Neapolis 
In October 2022 Ebecilio signed for Super League Greece 2 club Makedonikos Neapolis.

DHSC 
In January 2023 Ebecilio signed for the Dutch Fourth Division side DHSC.

International career 
Born in the Netherlands, Ebecilio is of Surinamese descent. Ebecilio has represented Netherlands U-17 and Netherlands U-19. He represented the Netherlands in the 2008 UEFA European Under-17 Football Championship and the 2010 UEFA European Under-19 Football Championship. On 9 February 2011, Ebecilio made his debut for Netherlands U-21 in a match against the Czech Republic.

Personal life
Ebecilio's uncle is also Dutch professional footballer Roland Alberg.

Career statistics

Club

Honours
Ajax
Eredivisie: 2010–11, 2011–12

APOEL
Cypriot First Division: 2016–17, 2017–18

Red Star Belgrade
Serbian SuperLiga: 2018–19

References

External links

APOEL official profile

1991 births
Living people
People from Hoorn
Dutch sportspeople of Surinamese descent
Dutch footballers
Netherlands youth international footballers
Netherlands under-21 international footballers
Association football wingers
AFC Ajax players
Eredivisie players
FC Metalurh Donetsk players
Ukrainian Premier League players
Gabala FC players
FC Mordovia Saransk players
FC Anzhi Makhachkala players
Russian Premier League players
APOEL FC players
Cypriot First Division players
Red Star Belgrade footballers
Serbian SuperLiga players
Júbilo Iwata players
J1 League players
Dutch expatriate footballers
Expatriate footballers in Ukraine
Expatriate footballers in Azerbaijan
Expatriate footballers in Russia
Expatriate footballers in Cyprus
Expatriate footballers in Serbia
Dutch expatriate sportspeople in Ukraine
Dutch expatriate sportspeople in Azerbaijan
Dutch expatriate sportspeople in Russia
Dutch expatriate sportspeople in Cyprus
Dutch expatriate sportspeople in Serbia
HVV Hollandia players
Dutch expatriate sportspeople in Japan
Expatriate footballers in Japan
Footballers from North Holland